The 1963 Grote Prijs Jef Scherens was the inaugural edition of the Grote Prijs Jef Scherens cycle race and was held on 8 May 1963. The race started and finished in Leuven. The race was won by Marcel Van Den Bogaert.

General classification

References

1963
1963 in road cycling
1963 in Belgian sport